Curtin is a nearly abandoned unincorporated community in eastern Nicholas County, West Virginia, United States. The area is situated at the bottomland surrounding the mouth of the Cherry River at its confluence with the Gauley River.  Curtin is also the location where state routes 20 and 55 cross the Gauley.

History 
Curtin was founded by General G. W. Curtin, and most likely was named for him or his family.

References

Unincorporated communities in Nicholas County, West Virginia
Unincorporated communities in West Virginia